Range Defenders is a 1937 American Western "Three Mesquiteers" B-movie directed by Mack V. Wright.

Plot

Cast 
Robert Livingston as Stony Brooke
Ray Corrigan as Tucson Smith
Max Terhune as Lullaby Joslin
Eleanor Stewart as Sylvia Ashton
Harry Woods as John Harvey
Earle Hodgins as Sheriff Dan Gray
Thomas Carr as George Brooke
Yakima Canutt as Henchman
John Merton as Henchman Craig
Harrison Greene as Auctioneer
Horace B. Carpenter as Pete
Frank Ellis as Henchman
Fred 'Snowflake' Toones as Cook

References

External links 

1937 films
1937 Western (genre) films
American black-and-white films
Three Mesquiteers films
Films directed by Mack V. Wright
Republic Pictures films
American Western (genre) films
Films produced by Sol C. Siegel
Films with screenplays by Joseph F. Poland
1930s English-language films
1930s American films